Thomas Tuck (born 28 March 1982) is a British actor and comedian known for being one third of comedy troupe The Penny Dreadfuls and as a stand-up comedian. He was nominated for the Best Newcomer award at the 2011 Edinburgh Festival Fringe.

Early life
Tuck attended the American International School of Dhaka in Bangladesh and Cardinal Heenan Roman Catholic High School and Notre Dame Sixth Form College in Leeds. As a child, he also lived in Sri Lanka, Denmark, Egypt, Malawi, Zimbabwe and the Philippines. He studied philosophy at the University of Edinburgh and graduated with a 2:2. While at university, he performed with the Edinburgh University Theatre Company; acting in, writing and directing plays, including directing a piece written by playwright Sam Holcroft, and was a member of acclaimed improvisational comedy troupe The Improverts. It was with The Improverts that he first met and performed with fellow comedians Humphrey Ker and David Reed.

Career

Tuck's radio work includes The Penny Dreadfuls Present... alongside David Reed and Humphrey Ker, and the BBC Radio 4 series Thom Tuck Goes Straight-to-DVD.

With The Penny Dreadfuls, Tuck debuted at the Edinburgh Festival Fringe in 2006. The group created new sketch shows for the four years that follow. In addition they created a radio series for BBC Radio 4 called The Brothers Faversham, which aired in 2008. A sequel series aired that same year, and for most years that followed The Penny Dreadfuls have performed a historical comedy play.

In 2011 BBC Radio 4 commissioned Thom Tuck Goes Straight To DVD, a comedy show adapted from his Edinburgh show that year. The pilot aired in February 2012, and a full series of four episodes began to air in April 2013.

His television credits include BBC Three's Comedy Shuffle, The Wrong Door, The Supersizers..., Dick and Dom's Funny Business and Mongrels.

He hosts and curates The Alternative Comedy Memorial Society with John-Luke Roberts at the New Red Lion Theatre in Islington.

Tuck has also ventured into the world of video game acting. In 2014 he took on the role of voicing Kablooey, a well dressed peacock and peggle master in the Popcap game Peggle Blast.

Theatre

1999 Edinburgh Festival Fringe
West Side Story, winner of Herald Angel Award.

NSDF 2003
Like Skinnydipping by Chris Perkin

2005 Edinburgh Festival Fringe & NSDF 2005
Scaramouche Jones by Justin Butcher

2006 Edinburgh Festival Fringe
Aeneas Faversham with The Penny Dreadfuls
Geronimo by Lucy Kirkwood, winner of ThreeWeeks Editors' Award.

2007 Edinburgh Festival Fringe
Aeneas Faversham Returns with The Penny Dreadfuls, winner of ThreeWeeks Editors' Award.

2008 Edinburgh Festival Fringe
Aeneas Faversham Forever with The Penny Dreadfuls

2009 National Tour
Totally Looped

2009 Edinburgh Festival Fringe
The Never Man with The Penny Dreadfuls
The Hotel by Mark Watson

2010 Edinburgh Festival Fringe
Penny Dreadfuls 2010 with The Penny Dreadfuls
Gutted: A Revenger's Musical by Danielle Ward & Martin White

2011 Edinburgh Festival Fringe
Thom Tuck Goes Straight-to-DVD
 Directed Bad Mother by Meryl O'Rourke

2012 Edinburgh Festival Fringe
Thom Tuck Flips Out

2013 Pleasance Theatre, London
Coalition written by Robert Khan and Tom Salinsky

2016 Edinburgh Festival Fringe
Thom Tuck: An August Institution

2018 King's Head Theatre, Islington
Brexit written by Robert Khan and Tom Salinsky

2022 Edinburgh Festival Fringe
Thom Tuck and Tim FitzHigham: Macbeth

References

External links
 Official Penny Dreadfuls website

Living people
English male stage actors
English male comedians
1982 births
Alumni of the University of Edinburgh
Male actors from Leeds
English male television actors
People educated at Cardinal Heenan Catholic High School, Leeds